Gabrijela Ujčić (born 2 October 1976) is a Croatian former swimmer.

Career 

Ujčić swam for Primorje swimming club in Rijeka where she was born. She won a bronze medal in the 4 × 100 m relay at the 1993 Mediterranean Games. She competed at the 1996 Summer Olympic Games finishing 46th in the women's 50 metre freestyle, 45th in the women's 100 metre freestyle and 42nd in the women's 100 metre butterfly.

Personal life 

Her niece Ana Herceg also has swum for Croatia.

References

1976 births
Living people
Swimmers at the 1993 Mediterranean Games
Olympic swimmers of Croatia
Swimmers at the 1996 Summer Olympics
Sportspeople from Rijeka
Croatian female swimmers
Mediterranean Games competitors for Croatia
20th-century Croatian women